Auckland County is one of the 141 cadastral divisions of New South Wales. It is at the extreme south-east of the state, with the Victorian border to the south, and the area to the north of the Brogo River the boundary to the north. It includes Bega, Eden and Merimbula.

The county was named after George Eden, who was the First Earl of Auckland between (1784-1849).

References

Counties of New South Wales